Henry George Jr. (November 3, 1862 – November 14, 1916) was an American newspaperman who served two terms as a United States representative from New York from 1911 to 1915.

He was the son of the American political economist Henry George (1839–1897).

Biography 
George was born in Sacramento, California, and attended the schools there. At the age of sixteen, he started working for a printing office, where he was employed for one year.

He moved with his parents to Brooklyn in 1880 and worked as a reporter for the Brooklyn Eagle in 1881. In 1884, he accompanied his father as his secretary on a lecture tour of Great Britain, at the close of which he joined the staff of the London Truth. He then returned to the United States and joined the staff of the North American Review. He was then managing editor of the Standard from 1887 to 1891, a correspondent in Washington, D.C. for a syndicate of western papers in 1891 and a correspondent in England for the same syndicate in 1892. In 1893, George became the managing editor of the Florida Citizen at Jacksonville, Florida.

He returned to New York City in 1895. Upon the death of his father on October 29, 1897, he was nominated to succeed his father as the candidate of the Jefferson Democracy Party for mayor of New York City, but he was unsuccessful. He married Marie Morelle Hitch (born January 22, 1879 ) from Orleans Parish, Louisiana on December 2, 1897 and was a special correspondent in Japan in 1906.

Congress 
George was elected as a Democrat to the Sixty-second and Sixty-third Congresses (March 4, 1911 – March 4, 1915). However, he was not a candidate for reelection in 1914.

Later career and death 
He engaged in literary pursuits until his death in Washington, D.C. and was interred in Green-Wood Cemetery in Brooklyn.

Works 
 The Life of Henry George (1904)
 The Menace of Privilege (1905)

References

External links 
 
 

1862 births
1916 deaths
American newspaper journalists
Georgists
Georgist politicians
Brooklyn Eagle
Burials at Green-Wood Cemetery
Politicians from Sacramento, California
Politicians from New York City
Democratic Party members of the United States House of Representatives from New York (state)
19th-century American journalists
20th-century American journalists
American male journalists
20th-century American politicians